A palletizer or palletiser is a machine which provides automatic means for stacking cases of goods or products onto a pallet.

Manually placing boxes on pallets can be time consuming and expensive; it can also put unusual stress on workers. The first mechanized palletizer was designed, built, and installed in 1948 by a company formerly known as Lamson Corp.

There are specific types of palletizers including the row-forming which were introduced in the early 1950s. In row-forming palletizing applications loads are arranged on a row forming area and then moved onto a different area where layer forming takes place. This process repeats until a full layer of goods and products are configured to be placed on a pallet.

The in-line palletizer was developed in the 1970s when higher speeds were needed for palletizing. This palletizer type utilizes a continuous motion flow divider that guides the goods into the desired area on the layer forming platform.

Robotic palletizers were introduced in the early 1980s and have an end of arm tool (end effector) to grab the product from a conveyor or layer table and position it onto a pallet. The end of arm tooling has evolved in recent years to accommodate a variation of pack pattern and package types.

See also 
 Unit load
 Pallet inverter
 Stretch wrap

References 

 Yam, K. L. (2009). "Encyclopedia of Packaging Technology". John Wiley & Sons. 

Material-handling equipment
Industrial equipment
Packaging machinery